Alexandru Vlahuță (5 September 1858 – 19 November 1919) was a Romanian writer. His best known work is România pitorească, an overview of Romania's landscape in the form of a travelogue. He was also the main editor of Sămănătorul magazine, alongside George Coșbuc.

Vlahuţă was born in Pleșești (currently called Alexandru Vlahuță), in the Principality of Moldavia (present-day Vaslui County, Romania) and studied in Bârlad during his early childhood. He took his Baccalaureate in Bucharest and afterwards attended law school for a short amount of time, but withdrew due to financial reasons. He died in Bucharest on 19 November 1919. His former home in Bucharest has been turned into a memorial museum.

References

1858 births
1919 deaths
People from Vaslui County
People of the Principality of Moldavia
Romanian writers
Members of the Romanian Academy elected posthumously